The East Carpathian Biosphere Reserve is a transboundary protected area, designated as an area of global importance under UNESCO's Programme on Man and the Biosphere.It is located in the Eastern Carpathians and includes parts of three countries: Poland, Slovakia and Ukraine.

Overview
The reserve was originally designated as a Polish–Slovak transboundary reserve in 1992; it was extended to include the Ukrainian part in 1998.

It includes the following national protected areas:
In Poland Bieszczady National Park (Bieszczadzki Park Narodowy) and the two neighbouring landscape parks called Cisna-Wetlina Landscape Park (Ciśniańsko-Wetliński Park Krajobrazowy) and San Valley Landscape Park (Park Krajobrazowy Doliny Sanu);
In Slovakia Poloniny National Park (Národný Park Poloniny) and adjacent areas;
In Ukraine Uzhanian National Nature Park and Nadsiansky Regional Landscape Park.

See also
 Primeval Beech Forests of the Carpathians

References

External links

Unesco.org: official East Carpathian Biosphere Reserve website
iabsi.com: East Carpathian Biosphere Reserve
Carpates.org: East Carpathian Biosphere Reserve 
Carpathians.org.ua: Carpathians of Ukraine

 Biosphere Reserve
Biosphere reserves of Poland
Biosphere reserves of Slovakia
Biosphere reserves of Ukraine
National parks of Poland
National parks of Slovakia
National parks of Ukraine
1992 establishments in Europe
Protected areas established in 1992